Balakiyem Takougnadi (born 16 November 1992) is an Austrian footballer.

He has previously played for FK Austria Wien II, LASK Linz and SC Wiener Neustadt.

Honours

Club
LASK Linz
 Austrian Regional League Central (2): 2012-13, 2013-14

References

External links
 
 

1992 births
Living people
Austrian footballers
SC Wiener Neustadt players
LASK players
SV Horn players
SV Ried players
2. Liga (Austria) players
People from Lomé
Association football midfielders